Takashi Taguchi may refer to:
 Takashi Taguchi (actor) (1942–2016), Japanese voice actor
 Takashi Taguchi (handballer) (born 1961), Japanese former handball player